Nieuw-Bergen is a town in the Dutch province of Limburg. It is a part of the municipality of Bergen (L.) and lies about 28 km north of Venlo. Nieuw-Bergen was officially founded on 9 July 1963 as the new settlement.

After the destruction of Bergen in 1944/1945, a new settlement was built further to the east. Construction started in 1955. In 1969, the town hall of the municipality was built in Nieuw Bergen. In 1975, a church was built.

In 1988, two British Royal Air Force soldiers were killed in the town.

Gallery

References

Populated places in Limburg (Netherlands)
Bergen, Limburg
1963 establishments in the Netherlands